Coleophora ceratoidis is a moth of the family Coleophoridae. It is found in Mongolia, Turkestan, southern Russia and China.

The larvae feed on Ceratoides eversmanniana. They feed on the generative organs of their host plant.

References

ceratoidis
Moths described in 1979
Moths of Asia